This is a list of Catholic churches in Austria.

Cathedrals
See: List of cathedrals in Austria#Roman Catholic
Graz Cathedral
Gurk Cathedral
Innsbruck Cathedral
New Cathedral, Linz
Salzburg Cathedral
St. Stephen's Cathedral, Vienna

Basilicas
Dominican Church, Vienna
Mariatrost Basilica
Mariazell Basilica
Piarist Church, Vienna
Schottenkirche, Vienna

Chapels
Dachstein Chapel
Sisi Chapel
Vergilius Chapel

Other churches
Am Schöpfwerk Church
Augustinian Church, Vienna
Capuchin Church, Vienna
St. Leopold's Church, Donaufeld
Church of Mariahilf
Church of St. Nikolaus, Lockenhaus
Church of the Teutonic Order, Vienna
Döbling Parish Church
Donau City Church
Franciscan Church, Salzburg
Franciscan Church, Vienna
Glanzing Parish Church
Heiligenstadt Parish Church St. Michael
Heiligenstadt St. James's Church
Jesuit Church, Vienna
Kaasgrabenkirche
Kahlenbergerdorf Parish Church
Karlskirche
Kirche am Steinhof
Maltese Church, Vienna
Maria am Gestade
Minoritenkirche, Vienna
Servite Church, Vienna
St. Anne's Church, Vienna
St. Michael's Church, Vienna
St. Peter's Church, Vienna
St. Rupert's Church, Vienna
St. Ulrich, Vienna
Votive Church, Vienna
Wotruba Church
Zirl Parish Church

See also
List of Roman Catholic dioceses in Austria
Roman Catholicism in Austria

Roman Catholic churches in Austria
Austria, Catholic
Austria
Lists of religious buildings and structures in Austria